Dysschema palmeri is a moth of the family Erebidae first described by Herbert Druce in 1910. It is found in Colombia and Peru.

References

Moths described in 1910
Dysschema